Australiophilus longissimus is a species of centipede in the Zelanophilidae family. It is endemic to Australia, and was first described in 1925 by German myriapodologist Karl Wilhelm Verhoeff.

Description
The original description of this species is based on a male specimen measuring 72 mm in length with 117 pairs of legs.

Distribution
The species occurs in north-eastern coastal Queensland. The type locality is Herberton.

Behaviour
The centipedes are solitary terrestrial predators that inhabit plant litter, soil and rotting wood.

References

 

 
longissimus
Centipedes of Australia
Endemic fauna of Australia
Fauna of Queensland
Animals described in 1925
Taxa named by Karl Wilhelm Verhoeff